Torak may refer to:
 Torak (Žitište),  a village in Serbia
 Lake Torak, a spring on the river Čikola, Croatia
 Kal Torak, a deity in The Belgariad, a fantasy epic written by David Eddings
 Torak, the protagonist of the Chronicles of Ancient Darkness series by Michelle Paver